Yamudiki Mogudu may refer to:
 Yamudiki Mogudu (1988 film), a Telugu-language fantasy film
 Yamudiki Mogudu (2012 film), an Indian Telugu-language fantasy comedy film